John Hipple Mitchell, also known as John Mitchell Hipple, John H. Mitchell, or J. H. Mitchell (June 22, 1835December 8, 1905) was an American lawyer, politician, and convicted criminal. He served as a Republican United States Senator from Oregon on three occasions between 1873 and 1905. He also served as president of the state senate, did the initial legal work involved in the dispute that led to the landmark Supreme Court case of Pennoyer v. Neff, and later was involved with the Oregon land fraud scandal, for which he was indicted and convicted while a sitting U.S. Senator. He is one of twelve U.S. Senators indicted while in office, and one of five convicted.

Early life

He was born in Washington County, Pennsylvania, with the name John Mitchell Hipple. He moved with his parents to Butler County, Pennsylvania, at the age of two. He attended public schools during much of his childhood, but also attended some private schools including the Witherspoon Institute. As a young man he was a schoolteacher. He seduced a 15-year-old female student, and, due to the resulting scandal, was forced to marry her.

Legal career
In 1857, Mitchell stopped teaching and decided to become a lawyer. He built a successful law practice in Pennsylvania. However, in 1860, he decided to leave his community and family, and moved to California with a local schoolteacher with whom he was having an affair. After arriving in California, he abandoned her and moved to Portland, Oregon. It was then that he decided to change his name to John Hipple Mitchell, using his middle name as his last name, and attempted to start a completely new life in Oregon. Almost immediately, he started to become a successful lawyer and build political connections. Mitchell was not an intellectual man, but he was very ambitious and knew how to develop business and political friendships with important people. In 1867, he was hired as a professor at Willamette University School of Medicine to teach medical jurisprudence. Mitchell remained as professor for almost four years.

During his law practice in Oregon, Mitchell did some legal work for a client named Marcus Neff.  Mitchell's dispute with Neff regarding some unpaid legal bills gave rise to the circumstances that led to the U.S. Supreme Court case of Pennoyer v. Neff.

Political career
Two years after arriving in Oregon, in 1862, he was elected to the Oregon State Senate. In 1864 he became President of the state Senate and served in that position until 1866. Because United States Senators were elected by the state legislatures during his lifetime, and that was the only office that Mitchell was to seek, this early position in the state Senate was the only popularly elected office that he would ever run for or win.

Mitchell was an unsuccessful candidate for the United States Senate from Oregon in 1866, losing to Henry W. Corbett. He tried again in 1872 and this time won, taking office in 1873. He petitioned to officially change his name after he was elected.

On the topic of names, during Mitchell's second period of Senate service (from November 18, 1885, to March 3, 1897), he concurrently served alongside two other different individuals named "John Mitchell", from other states. From November 18, 1885, to March 3, 1887, Mitchell served alongside Sen. John I. Mitchell from Pennsylvania; and from March 4, 1893, to March 3, 1897, Mitchell served alongside Sen. John L. Mitchell from Wisconsin.

By this time, he had married again, but had not divorced the woman he had married in Pennsylvania. His opponents tried to block him from becoming a senator by asking a Senate committee to expel him for what he had done in the past, charging him with bigamy, desertion and living under an assumed name. Though these charges were certainly true, the Senate Committee decided they were not relevant. Mitchell served in the Senate from 1873 to 1879, and was defeated for reelection. He ran for reelection to the Senate in 1882 but lost. In 1885, however, he was elected again to the Senate, and reelected in 1890.

Mitchell sought reelection by the Oregon Legislature in 1897, but his candidacy proved to be highly divisive: the resulting scandal prevented the 19th Oregon Legislative Assembly from organizing and, consequently, left Oregon with a vacant U.S. Senate seat for nearly two years. Joseph Simon was ultimately chosen for the seat.

While not in the Senate, Mitchell practiced law. Mitchell's last term in the Senate began in 1901 and was to last until 1907, but Mitchell died before it expired.

Mitchell was devoted to business interests and was against the populists and their political reforms. In the Senate, he was interested in transportation issues. He was chairman of the committee on railroads from 1877 to 1879 and from 1889 to 1893, and chairman of several committees related to coastlines and the ocean during his terms in the Senate. He was also chairman of the committee on claims from 1891 to 1893 and chairman of the committee of elections and privileges from 1895 to 1897.

In 1905, Mitchell was indicted in the Oregon land fraud scandal, involving his use of political influence in the federal government to help clients with their land claims. He was convicted.  An appeal of the conviction was under way and the Senate was beginning proceedings to expel him when Mitchell died of an illness in Portland, Oregon.

He was buried at River View Cemetery in Portland.

Legacy and family
The town of Mitchell, Oregon, was named after him.

His daughter, Mattie Elizabeth Mitchell, married François XVI Alfred Gaston, 5th Duc de La Rochefoucauld, Duc de Liancourt, Prince de Marcillac, Duc d'Anville, in 1892. His eldest daughter, Margaret Mitchell Griffin, died at age 41 in New York City, from shock following a surgical procedure.

See also
List of American federal politicians convicted of crimes
List of federal political scandals in the United States
List of United States Congress members who died in office (1900–49)
List of United States senators expelled or censured

References

External links
John H. Mitchell - Oregon History Project
 

|-

|-

|-

|-

|-

|-

|-

|-

|-

1835 births
1905 deaths
19th-century American politicians
American politicians convicted of federal public corruption crimes
Bigamists
Burials at River View Cemetery (Portland, Oregon)
Oregon lawyers
Oregon politicians convicted of crimes
People from Washington County, Pennsylvania
Presidents of the Oregon State Senate
Republican Party Oregon state senators
Republican Party United States senators from Oregon